The Individual large hill/10 km competition at the FIS Nordic World Ski Championships 2019 was held on 22 February 2019.

Results

Ski jumping
The ski jumping part was held at 10:30.

Cross-country skiing
The cross-country skiing part was held at 16:15.

References

Individual large hill/10 km